James Rosen may refer to:

James Rosen (jurist) (1909–1972), U.S. federal judge
James Rosen (journalist) (born 1968), American journalist
James Rosen (author), American journalist